Pension Wise is a free and impartial pension advice service set up by the government of the United Kingdom in 2015. 

It offers guidance for people on the pension changes introduced in the 2014 United Kingdom budget. Under these changes those with a defined contribution pension scheme are no longer required to buy an annuity. Instead they are allowed to take as much or as little from their pension pot as they wish to invest or spend themselves. Oliver Wright of The Independent newspaper described this change as the biggest change to pensions in nearly a century.

The cost of establishing and supporting the service in its first year was £35 million. The Pension Wise website has been criticised by the Work and Pensions Select Committee as has the low take up of Pension Wise appointments  The Equity Release Council have recommended that Pension Wise be extended to allow advice on equity release.

Responsibility for the service was initially under HM Treasury but moved to the Department for Work and Pensions in March 2016.

Pension Wise guidance is delivered via telephone and face to face appointments or online. The service is available to people aged 50 years and over with a Defined Contribution pension to help them understand what they can do with their pension pot(s).

Telephone appointments were provided through The Pensions Advisory Service (TPAS) (which was replaced in 2019 by the Money and Pensions Service), and face to face appointments through Citizens Advice. Appointments are delivered by over 150 guidance specialists whose training has been accredited by the Chartered Insurance Institute (CII) or the Pensions Management Institute (PMI). Pension Wise does not give specific product or provider recommendations. It also stops short of providing advice, which must still be delivered by a regulated financial adviser.

As of March 2021 there were more than 7.5 million visits to the Pension Wise website and more than 250,000 Pension Wise appointments.

According to the Financial Conduct Authority, 46% of consumers who took part in their consumer survey had received guidance from Pension Wise.

See also
Pensions in the United Kingdom

References

Further reading
Work and Pensions Select Committee - Pension freedom guidance and advice inquiry

External links
Pension Wise

Citizens Advice
Pensions in the United Kingdom